Talkeetna Airport  is a state-owned public-use airport located one nautical mile (2 km) east of the central business district of Talkeetna, in the Matanuska-Susitna Borough of the U.S. state of Alaska.

This airport is included in the National Plan of Integrated Airport Systems for 2011–2015, which categorized it as a general aviation airport. As per Federal Aviation Administration records, the airport had 1,150 passenger boardings (enplanements) in calendar year 2008.

The airport is home to at least seven air taxi operations, and is very busy during tourist season because of its proximity to Denali. Air services operating from the airport include Sheldon Air Service, Talkeetna Aero Services, K2 Aviation, and Talkeetna Air Taxi.

Facilities and aircraft 

Talkeetna Airport covers an area of 624 acres (253 ha) at an elevation of 358 feet (109 m) above mean sea level. Its one runway is designated 18/36 and has an asphalt pavement measuring 3,500 by 75 feet (1,067 x 23 m). It also has one helipad designated H1 with a gravel surface measuring 480 by 85 feet (146 x 26 m).

For the 12-month period ending December 31, 2009, the airport had 30,000 aircraft operations, an average of 82 per day:
67% general aviation, 32% air taxi, and 2% military. At that time there were 25 aircraft based at this airport: 96% single-engine, and 4% multi-engine.

Incidents

On Sunday 05 February 2023, an AH-64 Apache, "flipped over" at the airport. It was one of a flight of four from the 25th Attack Battalion based at Fort Wainwright at Fairbanks, Alaska some 300km north. Both crew members were injured in the crash.

References

External links 
 Topographic map from USGS The National Map
 

Airports in Matanuska-Susitna Borough, Alaska